Stormgate is an upcoming real-time strategy video game developed by Frost Giant Studios.

Gameplay 

Stormgate is a real-time strategy game set in a post-apocalyptic world. As standard for the genre, players concurrently gather resources, build bases and troops, and upgrade assets. The game will be free-to-play with free and monetized content. It is being developed to make typically complex genre accessible to new audiences while providing the option of balanced, competitive one-on-ones for more advanced players.

Development 

Former Blizzard developers Tim Morten and Tim Campbell founded Frost Giant Studios in October 2020 with intention to build an accessible real-time strategy game. Morten previously was StarCraft II: Legacy of the Void production lead, and Campbell had been Warcraft III: The Frozen Throne campaign lead designer. They raised nearly $5 million in seed funding, an additional $5 million in March 2021, and $25 million in its January 2022 Series A funding. Frost Giant debuted Stormgate in June 2022. An open beta is planned for 2023.

References

External links 
 

Upcoming video games
Real-time strategy video games
Free-to-play video games
Windows games
Multiplayer and single-player video games
Video games developed in the United States